Nikolai Andreevich Lebedev (August 8, 1919 – January 8, 1982) was a Soviet mathematician who worked on complex function theory and geometric function theory. Jointly with Isaak Milin, he proved the Lebedev–Milin inequalities that were used in the proof of the Bieberbach conjecture.

See also
Conformal map
Power series

Biographical references

References
.
.
.
 (Translation of the 1971 Russian edition, edited by P. L. Duren).

Complex analysts
Mathematical analysts
1919 births
1982 deaths
Soviet mathematicians